Krona is a supervillain appearing in comic books published by DC Comics.

Publication history
Krona first appeared in Green Lantern Vol. 2 #40 (Oct. 1965) and was created by writer John Broome and artist Gil Kane.

Fictional character biography
Born on Maltus, Krona is an Oan, scientist who became obsessed with observing the origins of the universe itself, despite an ancient legend that said discovering that secret would cause a great calamity. Krona constructs a machine that pierces the temporal barrier and views the beginnings of time itself. Krona catches a glimpse of the hand of creation depositing the speck that would become the entire cosmos. His machine explodes at that instant, and the universe is shattered causing the creation of the Multiverse as the universe replicates into an infinite number of parallel universes. At this same moment, the Anti-Matter Universe is created, unleashing evil into the cosmos; thus, the Monitor and the Anti-Monitor are born. As punishment for this act, Krona is transformed into pure energy by his fellow Oans and is sent to forever wander the cosmos. Krona's actions are what caused the Oans to become the Guardians of the Universe.

Krona returns to a physical state using the energies of Alan Scott's mystical power ring, but is again turned into his energy form by the Guardians. Krona is finally restored to his original form thanks to Nekron—who gained additional power due to the anomaly of an immortal entering the realm of the dead when the Guardians kill him—and attempts to kill all of the Guardians, only to be narrowly defeated by the weakened Green Lantern Corps.

Krona later resurfaces as the manifestation of Entropy itself and battles the New Guardians.

Cross-universal threat

While trying to discover the secret of universal creation, Krona destroys entire universes, eventually arriving in the Marvel Universe. There he confronts the Grandmaster, who, in an attempt to save his own universe, informs Krona of the existence of a being in the Marvel Universe who has witnessed the Big Bang. In exchange for Krona not destroying this universe, the Grandmaster and he will play a game; two teams, one from each universe, seek out 12 items of great power, six from each universe. Should Krona's team (the Avengers) win, Grandmaster will give the knowledge Krona seeks to him in return for not destroying his universe. But when Grandmaster's team (the Justice League) wins—thanks in part to Batman, Captain America and the Atom having discovered the nature of the game in time to ensure that the League wins instead of declaring a draw—Krona strikes down the Grandmaster in a rage, draining his knowledge to learn the identity of the being he spoke of, allowing him to summon Galactus. He then repeats the process with Galactus, but the Grandmaster tricks him and uses the power of the collected items to lock Krona at the multiversal junction point, having linked the two universes together.

The Grandmaster's hopes are dashed, though, when it becomes evident Krona would continue even in his extremely dangerous location in his insane quest to view the birth of a universe despite the risks posed to himself. Even from there, he continued his onslaught to destroy both the Marvel and DC universes to create a new one, so that he could watch creation first-hand. He forces them closer together, causing reality to warp wildly, and even making items and people switch worlds. He is briefly disrupted by the efforts of the Scarlet Witch and Green Lantern, but then continues his experiments. After being told what has happened by a dying Grandmaster, the two teams get to Krona's stronghold, led by Captain America and coordinated by the Martian Manhunter, pitting them against various brainwashed villains and increasing the scale of his 'recruits' as the heroes defeat each wave. He nearly kills all the heroes of both teams as they penetrate his final wave of defenses—even with Superman wielding Captain America's shield and Thor's hammer— but Hawkeye and the Flash (Barry Allen), who had earlier faked their deaths, stop his plan, Hawkeye firing a TNT arrow at Krona's machinery. The blast was immense, and ended up sucking Krona into the universe seed called the Cosmic Egg. The Spectre then pushes the worlds apart and reality returns to normal.

This egg is kept and studied in the JLA headquarters. Its fluctuations are a matter of intense scrutiny in the "Syndicate Rules" storyline, during which it is speculated that the reconstruction of the universes also altered the original 'rules' that allowed the League and the Syndicate to always win on their home ground, requiring each to fight harder in the future. After the League believes they have the situation under control, they implement tighter scans on the egg, to register alarms at even the most minor of fluctuations. At the end of the storyline, the New God Metron places several devices around the egg, so as to feed false readings to the League and to let the egg develop without interference.

Trinity

The Cosmic Egg is taken by Despero in the Trinity series. It is used by Despero, Morgaine le Fey and Enigma to create powerful monsters, and was later used in a ritual to reshape the world. In the aftermath of these events, Krona is freed. He recruits some Controllers in an attempt to communicate with the consciousness of the universe, but is double-crossed by them, who attempt to absorb and study his energies. In retaliation, Krona destroys them and their lab planet, only to hear the planet's consciousness "freed" from its "prison". Krona then sets out to do the same for many other planets.

Krona is later approached by Morgaine and her allies, seeking his power to fend off the returned Trinity (Superman, Batman, and Wonder Woman). Morgaine offers the planet Earth's consciousness in return, intending to replace it with the soul of Enigma's daughter.

Krona accepts and a lengthy battle ensues between him, the JLA, JSA, Titans, Teen Titans, the God-like trinity consisting of Superman, Wonder Woman and Batman, and other various heroes, aliens and villains. During the height of the battle Krona is imprisoned due to the united efforts of several heroes and villains, but is set free by Morgaine, finally snapped, claiming that if she cannot have the world, then nobody shall. Following that, Krona unleashes his powers and destroys the Earth.

Moments after Earth's destruction he encounters its essence, the Worldsoul, which continuously alters its form between a little girl, an adult woman and an old hag. Krona inquires about the law of universes, wishing to know how the Worldsoul and other entities like it function and exist, hoping to learn of some higher plan or design. However, he is horrified to learn that the Worldsoul has no actual function other than to simply exist, resonate and, most importantly, to feel, to share in the positive emotions of every lifeform that dwells upon its surface, at one with the Universe in a Great Dance with the other souls of worlds. This explanation, such as it is, defies all logic and science Krona has studied, and he believes this renders himself and his entire life, in effect, pointless. In a fit of rage, he attempts to destroy the Worldsoul, but is stopped by the Trinity, who have survived the destruction of Earth. Combining their powers with that of the Worldsoul, they imprison Krona and reform the Earth, restoring everything and everyone to the way it was prior to its destruction, even the supervillains of the planet. Krona's ultimate fate was to be remade as the Worldsoul of Earth-1, this time imprisoned for all eternity.

War of the Green Lanterns
After the events of the Blackest Night, a cloaked stranger appears on Ryut, walking near an ancient temple with seven pillars marked with the symbols of the Emotional Spectrum and plotting against the Lantern Corps.

The first act of this stranger's plan occurs with the abduction of the fear entity, Parallax, during the finale of "Blackest Night", imprisoning the creature within the pillar marked with the symbol of the Sinestro Corps. He then proceeds to remove the willpower entity, Ion, from Sodam Yat, effectively turning Daxam's sun from yellow back to red and killing hundreds of Daxamites in the process, and later helps Hector Hammond get out of prison, to pursue the Avarice Entity which is trapped inside Larfleeze's lantern.

The stranger is also shown working with Hank Henshaw (Cyborg Superman), telling him that enslaving and altering the qualities of the Alpha Lanterns will restore his mortality. He is also shown working with the telepathic Zardor in his plot to brainwash rookie members of the Green Lantern Corps that will lead to the destruction of the Green Lantern Corps.

The stranger also freed Lyssa Drak from the Book of the Black, and informs her that her assistance is required since another book will soon be made and a keeper is needed.

The stranger later appears on the Eastern Seaboard of the United States—with an obedient Parallax in tow—where he faces Hal Jordan, Nicole Morrison, Larfleeze, Saint Walker and the Indigo Tribe, seeking to obtain both the hope entity, Adara, and the compassion entity, Proselyte, for his collection.

When the figure captures the entities by ripping Proselyte and Adara from their hosts, he is confronted by Jordan. The figure finally reveals himself as Krona, the rogue Guardian, long believed dead – the bandages serving to help restore his body after the damage he has sustained in his previous encounters – and tells Jordan that prior to his banishment by the Guardians, he was the caretaker responsible for protecting the entities, which explains how he's aware of the orange power of avarice and its location as revealed during Hal Jordan's first encounter with Larfleeze, and that is why he can control them and the abilities they possess.

Despite the combined efforts of the New Guardians (sans Sinestro and Carol Ferris), Krona still managed to overwhelm them with the assistance of Ophidian. Immobilized by Ophidian's disruptive powers, Krona discovered the location of the Butcher from the avarice entity, and expunged it from Atrocitus's power battery. As Hal struggled with his defiance, Krona unleashed the power of all of the entities, effectively defeating the New Guardians. Having no other reason for staying on Earth, Krona left with the entities in tow.

Later, as Hal Jordan, Larfleeze, Atrocitus, Saint Walker, Indigo-1 and a returned Sinestro tried to reach Zamaron, since the entity of love was the only one still free, they found instead a delusional Carol Ferris who tells them that Krona had captured the Predator. Through Indigo-1 they follow Krona to the dead planet of Ryut where they found the Book of the Black, which after detecting the presence of the "New Guardians" opened its pages to unveil the history of Krona, revealing that it was Krona that was responsible for the Manhunters' programming glitch, which resulted in the annihilation of Sector 666. He did it to prove that there were flaws in an emotionless police force. He was also the one who created a gauntlet that harnessed Willpower which was the basis for the Green Lantern Power Ring. When he became the keeper of the emotional entities, he used the gauntlet to harness their powers and named it the Gauntlet of Power, since it could harness all emotions.

In the War of the Green Lanterns, Krona, along with the emotional entities, launched an attack on Oa, attacking the six remaining Guardians (with Ganthet working in the Anti-Matter universe at the time), by having them possessed by all the entities, except for Parallax, who is placed inside the Central Power Battery. With the yellow impurity returned to the Central Power Battery, all of the Green Lanterns—even the experienced wielders, with the apparent exception of the Green Lanterns who had been possessed by Parallax before—are placed under Krona's control, revealing that they could not overcome the fear associated with it as the Guardians had thought. Even the Alpha Lanterns are affected by the yellow impurity which made them enter into some kind of hibernation. The former Guardian then declares that he will show the universe the true power of the Green Lanterns. However, despite his attempts to stop them by using Mogo against them, Hal Jordan, John Stewart, Guy Gardner and Kyle Rayner are able to escape Krona and fight back by using the rings of the other Corps — Hal wielding a Sinestro and an Orange ring, Guy a Red and a Star Sapphire, Kyle a Blue, and John an Indigo — to escape Parallax's influence long enough to kill Mogo and extract Parallax from the Power Battery. Undaunted, Krona uses all seven varieties of power ring at once, attacking Hal Jordan and the freed Sinestro (who had just been selected by another green ring). Despite his greater power, Krona is eventually killed by Hal Jordan, which leads him to being discharged by the Guardians of the Universe for treason. Afterwards, the Guardians of the Universe then wish to honor the fallen Guardian by putting him in the crypt on Oa, along with other dead Lanterns. Many Lanterns disagree with their decision and journey to the Crypt where they encounter Salaak creating a space for Krona. Later, Ganthet honors his promise to Atrocitus and gives Krona's corpse to him to do as he wishes.

The New 52
Following the War of the Green Lanterns, it is revealed that Atrocitus has kept Krona's corpse as a 'confidant', talking to the body when he needs to give voice to his feelings about the Red Lantern Corps and his plans to upgrade their intelligence. After granting intellects to three Red Lanterns, Atrocitus returns to the place where he has left Krona's body only to find it missing. Although Atrocitus attempts to find Krona's body, he is left to consider both the worrying possibility that Krona has come back to life, when faced with a revolt from Bleez, Atrocitus starts to wonder if the loss of Krona's body has robbed him of the focus of his rage, as he has begun to try and justify his actions where he previously considered his mere identity enough of a justification. Krona's body, however, is found to be possessed by Abysmus, a demonic entity created by the earliest experiments of Atrocitus with shamanistic and necromantic magic, who willingly ate his body and flayed his skin to empower himself and a race of similar creatures, the so-called Abysmorphs.

Following the events of "Rise of the Third Army", in the opening of Wrath of the First Lantern, Krona's history has been changed: although he attempted to observe the beginning of the universe, the cosmos-spanning hand now bears a Lantern Power ring and when the viewscreen explodes, it is because a time-travelling ship has just arrived. From the ship, appears the mysterious Volthoom. During a conversation with Atrocitus, Krona's spirit-which manifests as a result of Abysmus's manipulations-claims that he became caught up in his work after his wives and child were killed in an accident, but Atrocitus dismisses the idea that this excuses his later actions; moments later, the newly freed Volthoom disperses Krona's spirit, apparently ending the last remnants of his existence.

It was also revealed that Krona's banishment from the Guardians of the Universe was not from the result of his machinations, but because he ordered the Manhunters to destroy Sector 666.

The Lost Army
A very alive Krona later finds John Stewart, Kilowog, Arisia, Two-Six and new Lantern Xrill-Vrek in a seemingly hostile territory, a long way from home. Given that this Krona is back to his Maltusan look, does not recognize any of the Green Lanterns and that the Green Lantern rings cannot locate anyone or the Central Power Battery, provides a little clue as to what has happened. Either they have been displaced to another universe, another time, or both.

Powers and abilities
Krona possesses a supreme genius-level intellect, but his arrogance, lack of patience, short temper and above all insatiable hunger for knowledge have gotten the better of him. If it brought him any benefit, he would be the sort to attempt to quantify dance or measure a soul, solely for the sake of knowing. It is this madness that got Krona exiled and brought about his constant defeats. He has unhesitatingly destroyed universes and risked his own existence for a chance to gain deeper insight.

Like the rest of his species, Krona possesses enhanced physical abilities, vast psionic powers (including telepathy and telekinesis) and virtual immortality (he does not need to breathe, eat or sleep, and can regenerate from any injury at an accelerated rate). His powers were later increased by Nekron, making him more powerful than any of the Guardians.

As Entropy, Krona was composed of anti-energy, could absorb others into his body, converting them into more anti-energy, and was able to create an army composed of anti-energy that were completely under his control. During the JLA/Avengers miniseries, where he wielded the power of all the universes he had previously destroyed, Krona proved able to easily defeat both the Grandmaster and Galactus, although the Grandmaster's power was sufficient to make him initially hesitant at the prospect of fighting the other being until his attempt to beat the Grandmaster in a game to gain the information he sought failed.

Also, as the caretaker of the Emotional entities which are the pure embodiments of the emotions comprising the Emotional Spectrum, Krona wields the powers of the entire emotional spectrum.

In other media

Television
 Krona appears in the Green Lantern: The Animated Series episode "Loss". He is seen during a flashback sequence detailing the creation of the Anti-Monitor on Maltus.
 Although Krona does not appear in the 2018 Arrowverse crossover events "Elseworlds" and "Crisis on Infinite Earths" on The CW, his role of creating the multiverse and Anti-Monitor was given to the Monitor / Mar Novu.

Film
 Krona appears in the 2011 live-action film Green Lantern, voiced by Clancy Brown. This version is a rogue Guardian of the Universe, who accidentally unleashed and was consumed by Parallax. His name is revealed in the special features included in the Blu-ray edition under the featurette "The Guardians Revealed".
 Krona appears in the film Green Lantern: Emerald Knights. In the film, he created the Anti-Matter universe billions of years ago threatening all creation. As punishment, he was turned into energy and cast out through the cosmos, but he reconstituted himself in the Anti-Matter universe and returned via a portal from the Oan sun. In the film's climax, he appears as a gigantic Anti-Matter entity controlling Shadow Demons. Arisia figured out that they have to hit him with matter of equal or greater mass. The Lanterns decided to use the planet Oa itself as a weapon against Krona. All of the Green Lanterns, including Mogo, used their rings to throw Oa and slam Krona into the sun to eliminate him for good.

Video games
Krona appears in DC Universe Online as the final boss in the Oan Sciencells alert and also as the Round 10 boss for the Survival Mode: Oan Sciencells event.

References

External links
 DCU Guide: Krona (Entropy)

DC Comics aliens
DC Comics characters with accelerated healing
DC Comics characters with superhuman strength
DC Comics extraterrestrial supervillains
DC Comics supervillains
DC Comics deities
DC Comics characters who have mental powers
DC Comics scientists
DC Comics telekinetics 
DC Comics telepaths 
Fictional characters with elemental transmutation abilities 
Fictional characters with energy-manipulation abilities 
Fictional characters with absorption or parasitic abilities
Fictional characters with immortality
Fictional mass murderers
Characters created by John Broome
Characters created by Gil Kane
Fictional mad scientists
Superhero film characters
Comics characters introduced in 1965